Michael Christoph Hanow (also Hanov, Hanovius) (12 December 1695, in Zamborst near Neustettin, Pomerania – 22 September 1773, in Danzig) was a German meteorologist, historian, professor of mathematics and since 1717 rector of the Academic Gymnasium Danzig.

Hanow was educated in Danzig and Leipzig and was a private teacher in Dresden, Leipzig and Danzig. In the year 1727 he became a member of the Academic Gymnasium Danzig. He wrote numerous articles and books. Since 1739 he published the Danziger Nachrichten a weekly journal with weather forecasting. The term biology was introduced by him. In the years 1745 until 1767 he wrote Jus Culmense, the complete Kulm law (Kulmer Recht) and a collection of not yet published Prussian documents.

Together with Georg Daniel Seyler, Gottfried Lengnich and David Braun he belonged to the most important local historians in the 18th century.

Literature 
 Michael Christoph Hanow: Philosophiae naturalis sive physicae dogmaticae: Geologia, biologia, phytologia generalis et dendrologia. 1766. 
 Carl von Prantl, Works of Hanov, Michael Christoph. In: Allgemeine Deutsche Biographie (ADB). volume 10, Duncker & Humblot, Leipzig 1879, page 524 f.

External links 
 Works of Hanow in the Catalog of the Deutschen Nationalbibliothek

18th-century German historians
18th-century German mathematicians
1695 births
1773 deaths
German male non-fiction writers
People from the Province of Pomerania
People from Złotów County
18th-century German male writers